Albert Johnson (April 17, 1880 – January 6, 1941) was a Canadian amateur soccer player who competed in the 1904 Summer Olympics. In 1904 he was a member of the Galt F.C. team, which won the gold medal in the soccer tournament. He played all two matches as a midfielder.

References

External links

1880 births
1941 deaths
Canadian soccer players
Association football midfielders
Footballers at the 1904 Summer Olympics
Olympic gold medalists for Canada
Olympic soccer players of Canada
Olympic medalists in football
Medalists at the 1904 Summer Olympics
20th-century Canadian people